was a 14-member Japanese female idol group that was active from 2014 to 2017. Created by songwriter/producer Shunichi Tokura as part of his "Pan-Pacific Project", the group was a tribute to the 1970s J-pop duo Pink Lady, performing only songs written by Tokura.

History
Pink Babies opened their YouTube channel on May 28, 2014. They released their debut digital single "Wanted" on July 16 and hosted their debut concert at Mt. Rainier Hall Shibuya Pleasure Pleasure on August 24.

Pink Babies also performed internationally in 2014 and 2015, notably at the Japan Expo in France and at the Anime Festival Asia in Indonesia.

On February 25, 2016, Pink Babies made a guest appearance at the Tokyo Marathon Expo at Tokyo Big Sight.

On August 31, 2016, the group released their first CD single "Nagisa no Sindbad", which peaked at No. 5 on Oricon's Indies Chart. By this time, the lineup was reduced to 10 members. On September 26, seven members of the group formed the spin-off project "Pink Babies EX" and released their cover of the Linda Yamamoto song "Neraiuchi".

Pink Babies' second and final CD single "UFO", released on February 15, 2017, hit No. 1 on Oricon's Indies Chart. Two months later, with eight members remaining, the group announced their disbandment, with their final show held at Mt. Rainier Hall Shibuya Pleasure Pleasure on May 26.

On September 3, 2018, Rio Ohmori, Rio Shiseki, Sara Suzuki, Chinatsu Suzuki, Kotono Satō, Mayu Suganuma, and Aina Yoshida reunited for one night only for the NHK BS Premium special  dedicated to songwriter/producer Shunichi Tokura. The special aired on September 30.

Post-disbandment
Ohmori was a member of the "Love Cocchi" division of the idol group  until its disbandment in 2022. Satō is with the rock idol quartet Flowlight. Suganuma and Yoshida formed their own duo MayuAina. Yui Sakurai pursued a solo career before joining the idol group My Dear Darlin' (a sister group of FES☆TIVE) in January 2020.

Former members
Final lineup on May 26, 2017
 * (born May 10, 1997)
 * (born December 22, 2001)
  (born November 30, 1999)
  (born January 27, 2002)
 * (born December 15, 1996)
 * (born August 16, 2000)
  (born December 20, 2000)
 * (born March 17, 1997)

Graduated on April 9, 2017
 * (born October 8, 1998)
 * (born February 21, 2000)

Graduated at the 2015 Tokyo Idol Festival
  (born February 20, 2000)
  (born September 24, 1996)
  (born September 26, 1998)
  (born July 11, 2000)

* Also members of Pink Babies EX

Discography

Singles
Pink Babies
  (2014 July 16)
 "Le Sinbad de la plage" (2015 July 2–5; Japan Expo 2015 (Paris) exclusive)
  (2016 August 31)
 "UFO" (2017 February 15)

Pink Babies EX
  (2016 September 26)

References

External links
  (Space Shower Music)
 

2014 establishments in Japan
Japanese girl groups
Japanese idol groups
Japanese pop music groups
Musical groups established in 2014
Musical groups disestablished in 2017
Musical groups from Tokyo
Tribute bands

ja:ピンク・ベイビーズ